The Super Nova gas field is a natural gas field located in the Timor Sea. It was discovered in 2000 and developed by Tangiers Petroleum. It began production in 2001 and produces natural gas and condensates. The total proven reserves of the Super Nova gas field are around 80.6 trillion cubic feet (2303 km³), and production is slated to be around 1 billion cubic feet/day (28.6×105m³).

References

Natural gas fields in Australia